Simon Symonds M.A. (d. 1551) was a Canon of Windsor from 1535–1551.

Career

He was educated at Eton College and King's College, Cambridge and graduated B.A. in 1509 and M.A. in 1511.

He was appointed:

Vicar of Elmdon, Essex 1518
Vicar of St Michael's Church, Bray 1522–1551
Vicar of South Petherton, Somerset, 1533–1548
Prebendary of Lichfield 1534–1546
Prebendary of Netheravon in Salisbury 1534
Rector of Taplow, Buckinghamshire 1537–1551
Prebendary of Lincoln 1544

He was appointed to the first stall in St George's Chapel, Windsor Castle in 1535, and held the stall until 1551.

Symonds was considered to be a prime candidate for the subject of the proverbial character, "The Vicar of Bray", since he was twice a Papist and twice a Protestant, serving as vicar from Henry VIII to Elizabeth I.

Notes 

1551 deaths
Canons of Windsor
People educated at Eton College
Alumni of King's College, Cambridge
Year of birth missing